Hector Gosset (9 September 1926 – 27 October 2007) was a Belgian sprinter. He competed in the men's 100 metres at the 1948 Summer Olympics.

References

1926 births
2007 deaths
Athletes (track and field) at the 1948 Summer Olympics
Belgian male sprinters
Olympic athletes of Belgium
Place of birth missing